Nicole Ignacio Cordoves (born April 15, 1992) is a Filipino model, host, and beauty pageant titleholder who was crowned Binibining Pilipinas Grand International 2016. She represented the Philippines at the Miss Grand International 2016 pageant and finished as 1st Runner-Up.

Early and personal life 
Cordoves has Filipino-Chinese ancestry. She graduated from Ateneo de Manila University with a degree in Development Management, minoring in AB Economics.

Her brother, Joshua is engaged to Binibining Pilipinas International 2019 Bea Magtanong.

Pageantry

Competitions
Cordoves won Miss Chinatown 2014. She was crowned 1st runner-up at Miss Grand International 2016, having been chosen to represent the Philippines at the pageant as Binibining Pilipinas Grand International 2016.

Hosting
She co-hosted Binibining Pilipinas 2018 with Pia Wurtzbach and Richard Gutierrez. In 2021, Cordoves and Catriona Gray co-hosted the 57th Binibining Pilipinas, the first pageant in the Philippines with all-female hosts, earning critical acclaim. She teamed up with 2020 Miss Grand International runner-up Samantha Bernardo for a photo shoot prior to the pageant. Cordoves, Catriona Gray, Samantha Bernardo and Edward Barber co-hosted Binibining Pilipinas 2022.

Career
She worked as a speech writer for Cesar Purisima, the former Secretary of Finance. Cordoves is a Miss Q and A judge on It's Showtime, and is one of the co-hosts of "Dr. Care" and "Pasok Mga Suki" on PIE Channel with journalist Migs Bustos and online business personality Madam Inutz. She is also a judge on Drag Den Philippines, hosted by Manila Luzon.

References

External links 

Binibining Pilipinas Official Website
Miss Grand International

Nicole Cordoves Official YouTube Channel

 
Living people
Binibining Pilipinas winners
Filipino female models
1992 births